Bharat Vyas (1918–1982) was a noted Indian lyricist who wrote the songs for Hindi films in 1950s and 1960s.

Biography
Bharat Vyas was born in Bikaner in British India on 06 January 1918 in Pushkarna Brahmin family. He studied B.Com. at Calcutta and after completing his studies he came to Bombay. His first film as lyricist was Duhaai (1943). He was the writer of the prayer song, ‘Ae Malik Tere Bande Hum’ and 'Ye Kaun Chitrakar Hai'. He directed a Bollywood film Rangila Rajasthan (1949) for which he wrote the lyrics and composed three songs. He also wrote the lyrics for film Mata Mahakali (1968); a song is "Jo ugta hai be dhalta hai"

Some of his evergreen poems:

 
 
 
 
 
 
 
 
 
 
 
 
 
 
 
 
 
 
 
 
 

He died on 4 July 1982 in Mumbai. His younger brother was the actor Brij Mohan Vyas (1920–2013).

Filmography
Some of films for which he wrote songs are:
 Sawan Aya Re
 Bijali
 Pyar Ki Pyas
 Tamasha
 Muqaddar
 Shri Ganesh Janma
 Aankhen
 Hamara Ghar
 Raj Mukut
 Janmashtami
 Nakhre
 Bhola Shankar
 Shri Chaitanya Mahaprabhu (1954)
 Parineeta
 Jagaduru Shankaracharya
 Andher Nagari Chaupat Raja
 Oonchi Haweli
 Toofan Aur Diya
 Janam Janam Ke Phere
 Do Aankhen Barah Haath
 Bedard Zamana Kya Jane (1959)
 Fashion
 Goonj Uthi Shehnai (1959)
 Kavi Kalidas
 Suvarna Sundari
 Mausi
 Angulimaal (1960)
 Sampoorna Ramayana (1961)
 Stree (1961)
 Navrang
 Rani Roopmati
 Chandramukhi
 Purnima (1965 film)
 Mahabharat (1965 film)
 Sati Savitri
 Boond Jo Ban Gayee Moti (1967)

References
 

1918 births
1982 deaths
Rajasthani people
Indian lyricists
People from Churu district
20th-century Indian poets
Poets from Rajasthan